is a former Japanese football player.

Club statistics

References

External links

1981 births
Living people
Waseda University alumni
Association football people from Kyoto Prefecture
Japanese footballers
J2 League players
Japan Football League players
Kyoto Sanga FC players
Arte Takasaki players
FC Gifu players
Association football midfielders